The 1986 Copa Libertadores Final was a two-legged football match-up to determine the 1986 Copa Libertadores champion.

It was contested by Argentine club River Plate and Colombian club América de Cali. The first leg of the tie was played on October 22 at Pascual Guerrero Stadium of Cali, with the second leg played on October 29 at Estadio Monumental in Buenos Aires.

River Plate won the series 3–1 on aggregate.

Qualified teams

Venues

Match details

First leg

Second leg

References

External links 
 Copa Libertadores 1986 at RSSSF
 Copa Libertadores 1986 at Bola na Area (In Portuguese)
 Copa Libertadores 1986 at Ceroacero.es (In Spanish)

1986
l
l
l
l
1986–87 in Argentine football
1986